1969 is a studio album by American rapper Myka 9. It was released on Fake Four Inc. in 2009. Entirely produced by Canadian producer Factor, it features guest appearances from Aceyalone, Busdriver, Awol One, and Gel Roc. The title of the album comes from the year Myka 9 was born and the zeal of that era. In promotion of the album, Myka 9 toured across the United States with Factor, Sole, and Ceschi.

Critical reception

Spence D. of IGN gave the album a 9.7 out of 10, saying: "At the risk of sounding hyperbolic, Myka 9 has dropped one of the best, most expansive, and deeply rooted rap albums to hit the scene in quite some time." Thomas Quinlan of Exclaim! said, "Myka 9 is one of the best, most slept on MCs making music today, and 1969 is the best work he's done in a long time."

Track listing

Personnel
Credits adapted from liner notes.

 Myka 9 – vocals
 Factor – production, mixing
 Josh Palmer – bass guitar (1), mixing
 Josef Leimberg – trumpet (2)
 Shannon Ivey – backing vocals (2, 5, 6, 13, 15)
 Aceyalone – vocals (6)
 Busdriver – vocals (8)
 Awol One – vocals (14)
 Gel Roc – vocals (14)
 Jeremy Goody – mastering
 Lazerus Pit – cover art
 319 – design, layout

References

External links
 
 

2009 albums
Myka 9 albums
Fake Four Inc. albums
Albums produced by Factor (producer)